Lampert Hont-Pázmány may refer to:
 Lampert Hont-Pázmány (lord), Hungarian lord and founder of the Bozók Abbey (died 1132)
 Lampert Hont-Pázmány (bishop), Hungarian prelate, Bishop of Eger (died 1275)